The Shishumar-class submarines are diesel-electric attack submarines, currently in active service with the Indian Navy. These submarines are an Indian variant of the Type 209 submarines developed by the German yard Howaldtswerke-Deutsche Werft under the internal designation "Type 1500". The first two vessels were built by HDW at Kiel, Germany, while the remainder were built by Mazagon Dock Limited, at Mumbai, India, under a technology transfer agreement. The submarines were commissioned between 1986 and 1994.

History
India signed the agreement for these submarines with Howaldtswerke-Deutsche Werft (HDW) on 11 December 1981. The agreement called for building of two submarines in West Germany, the supply of knocked-down kits for assembling two more submarines in Mazagon Dock Limited (MDL), and training for construction and logistics services. An agreement was announced in 1984 for the construction of two additional submarines in MDL, but was subsequently cancelled due to economic crisis in the late 1980s. The four submarines that were finally built form the 10th submarine squadron based at Mumbai.

Mid Life Upgrade

The Indian Navy awarded a $151 million contract for mid-life upgrade and certification of INS Shishumar in 2018. The refit was carried out by MDL at Mumbai with technical cooperation from ThyssenKrupp Marine Systems. The refit was planned to be completed by 2021 with a similar upgrade for another vessel of Shishumar-class submarine to follow.

Ships of the class

Commissions received during the order

In a July 2005 interview with NDTV, V. P. Singh said that in 1987, while he was a minister, he had received a telegram from the Indian ambassador in Germany with the information that Indian agents had received large illegal commissions in the HDW submarine deal.  Singh informed the then prime minister Rajiv Gandhi about this and instituted an enquiry. Subsequently, this led to differences and Singh decided to resign from the cabinet.

See also
List of active Indian Navy ships

References

External links
 Bharat Rakshak
 Global Security
 Hellenic Navy's Submarine OCEANOS (S-118) 3d animation

Submarine classes
Attack submarines
 
Type 209 submarines